The 1915 Keighley by-election was a parliamentary by-election held for the House of Commons constituency of Keighley in the West Riding of Yorkshire on 29 June 1915.

Vacancy
The by-election was caused by the appointment of the sitting Liberal MP, Stanley Buckmaster as Lord Chancellor and his consequent elevation to the peerage.

Candidates
Keighley Liberals chose Sir Swire Smith as their candidate. Smith was a well known locally in  business and public life. He had become a national figure through his promotion of technical education.

The result
There being no other candidates putting themselves forward Smith was returned unopposed.

See also
List of United Kingdom by-elections 
United Kingdom by-election records

References

1915 elections in the United Kingdom
Unopposed by-elections to the Parliament of the United Kingdom in English constituencies
1915 in England
By-elections to the Parliament of the United Kingdom in Bradford constituencies
Keighley
1910s in Yorkshire
June 1915 events